Roger B. Fillingim is an American psychologist and distinguished professor at the University of Florida who won its Research Foundation Professorship.

References

Year of birth missing (living people)
Living people
University of Florida faculty
21st-century American psychologists
University of Alabama alumni